Lara Yussif Zara (born 1982) is an Assyrian politician who served as the mayor of the town of Alqosh in Nineveh Governorate, Iraq. Zara was appointed to the mayorship in July 2017 by the Kurdistan Democratic Party-led Nineveh Provincial Council after the previous mayor had charges of corruption by the Provincial Council. Zara is a member of the Kurdistan Democratic Party.

Mayorship of Alqosh
Immediately upon becoming the mayor of Alqosh, protests were held in Alqosh. Zara argued that only Kurdistan Regional Government can keep the locals of Alqosh safe, mentioning the situation in Mosul as a reason to not trust the federal government in Baghdad. In April 2019, Zara welcomed a delegation from the United States led by Deputy Chief of the American embassy in Iraq and Consul General in Kurdistan Steve Fagan to Alqosh for the inspection of the Tomb of Prophet Nahum located in the town. In June 2019, she visited America and met with American officials to raise awareness of the circumstances of the Christians in the country.   In November 2021, she announced that with the financial support of the US Government, the Office of the Prime Minister of the Kurdistan Regional Government, and private donors, the main part of the restoration work on the tomb of Prophet Nahum had been completed; however, the site was not yet ready to be reopened to the public.

References

1982 births
Living people
Chaldean Catholics
21st-century Iraqi women politicians
21st-century Iraqi politicians
Iraqi Assyrian people
Iraqi Kurdistani politicians
People from Nineveh Governorate
Peshmerga
Kurdistan Democratic Party politicians